Rhododendron ponticum, called common rhododendron or pontic rhododendron, is a species of Rhododendron native to the Iberian Peninsula in southwest Europe and the Caucasus region in northern West Asia.

Description

It has two subspecies:
R. p. baeticum (Boiss. & Reut.) Hand.-Mazz. – Found in central and southern Portugal and southern Spain (in the Province of Cádiz).
R. p. ponticum – Found around the southern Black Sea Basin (eastern Bulgaria, northern Turkey, Georgia, Northern Caucasus) and central Lebanon.

And a variegated variety:
R. p. var. heterophyllum R. Ansin – Found in Turkey.

Distribution and habitat
The species has two disjunct populations, one in the southwestern Iberian Peninsula (central and southern Portugal and southwestern Spain) and the other near the southern Black Sea Basin (eastern Bulgaria, northern Turkey, Georgia, and Northern Caucasus). It has also been introduced to Madeira, India, Belgium, England ,Scotland, France and Ireland.

The range in the Iberian Peninsula is limited to mountain ranges, the Caramulo mountains, the Monchique range and the Aljibe range. A remnant of the original laurissilva forests that covered the peninsula 66 million years ago.

Though the common rhododendron was present in Great Britain prior to the most recent ice age, it did not recolonise afterwards and the modern ecology of the island developed without it. Its presence today in Great Britain is due to humans introducing it, and it easily naturalises and becomes a pest in some situations, often covering whole hillsides (especially in Snowdonia and the western British Isles). In the British Isles, it colonises moorlands, uplands, shady woodlands (alongside escaped laurels and the native holly) and in areas of acid soils, often in shaded areas.

Historical range
Fossil evidence shows it had a much wider range across most of southern and western Europe before the Late Glacial Maximum, or until about 20,000 years ago.

It was noted by the botanist Joseph Pitton de Tournefort during his travels in the Near East in 1700–02, and so received its name from Linnaeus to identify the ancient kingdom on the south shores of the Black Sea, Pontus, in which it grew.  At the other end of its range, in southern Spain, Linnaeus' friend and correspondent Clas Alströmer found it growing with oleander. It was introduced to Britain as an ornamental shrub in 1763, and later planted as cover for game birds. It is now considered to be an invasive species.

Cultivation and uses
Rhododendron ponticum subsp. baeticum is one of the most extensively cultivated rhododendrons in western Europe. It is used as an ornamental plant in its own right, and more frequently as a rootstock onto which other more attractive rhododendrons are grafted. The plants were first grown in Britain in the 1760s, supplied by Conrad Loddiges, and became widely distributed through the commercial nursery trade in the late 18th and early 19th centuries. The roots readily send up suckers from below the graft, often allowing it to overtake the intended grafted rhododendron.

Honey produced with pollen from the flowers of this plant can be quite poisonous, causing severe hypotension and bradycardia in humans if consumed in sufficient quantities, due to toxic diterpenes (grayanotoxins).

Invasive species
Suckering of the root, together with its abundant seed production, has led to it becoming an invasive species over much of western Europe and in parts of New Zealand.  Rhododendron control is a key element in nature conservation in those areas.
Conservation organisations in Britain now believe R. ponticum has become "a severe problem" in the native Atlantic oakwoods of the west highlands of Scotland and in Wales, and on heathlands in southern England, crowding out the native flora.  Clearance strategies have been developed, including the flailing and cutting down of plants with follow-up herbicide spraying. Injection of herbicide into individual plants has been found to be more precise and effective.

A study in the journal Functional Ecology also showed that invasive rhododendron nectar was toxic to European honeybees (Apis mellifera), killing individuals within hours of consumption. It also paralyzed bees of the species Andrena carantonica (no named A. scotica, a solitary mining bee. Bees became paralysed and exhibited excessive grooming or other distress behaviours after feeding on Rhododendron nectar, and ate less food than bees fed a control nectar. In contrast the buff-tailed bumblebee (Bombus terrestris) was not affected by the rhododendron nectar.  It is important not to see Rhododendron as a problem species for honey bees as they actually avoid the flowers owing to their ability to detect the toxin nectar.  The toxicity is caused by grayanotoxin 1 which is one of several highly hydroxylated diterpenoid defence chemicals produced in the leaves of Rhododendron to protect against herbivores - e.g. the Thrips Heliothrips haemorrhoidalis.  Some species of honey bee (Apis mellifera sub spp caucasica) tolerate the toxin and make so called mad-honey.

Identification difficulties Recent efforts to manage the spread of rhododendron ponticum in the United Kingdom has led to some controversy, particularly within the grounds of Taymouth castle in highland Perthshire. There remains debate over appropriate identification of the plant, particularly where it is interspersed amongst clumps of Japanese Laurel (Aucuba Japonica) in areas of mixed woodland. Tensions surrounding the management of these cohabiting species were brought to a head in early December 2022 when prominent arboriculturalists faced strong opposition from machine operators within the estate over correct identification and subsequent management of the plant, culminating in the destruction of a large thicket of laurel. While there remains debate over the associated similarities and differences between the plants, contemporary research indicates the likelihood of a hybridisation between the two species in this niche of woodland, meaning that Japanese laurel may indeed be viewed and treated in a like manner to rhododendron within this habitat niche.

See also
Catawbiense hybrid – hybrid with R.ponticum

References

External links

Flora Europaea: Rhododendron ponticum
Rhododendron Ponticum is the emblem and symbol of Bulgaria's most exotic National Park – The Strandja mountains

Centre for Conservation Strategy: Rhododendron ponticum in Britain
Danish Rhododendron Society: Rhododendron ponticum in Europe
Milne, R. I., & Abbott, R. J. (2000). Origin and evolution of invasive naturalized material of Rhododendron ponticum L. in the British Isles. Molecular Ecology 9: 541–556 Abstract.

ponticum
Flora of Bulgaria
Flora of Georgia (country)
Flora of Lebanon
Flora of Portugal
Flora of Russia
Flora of Spain
Flora of Turkey
Plants described in 1762
Taxa named by Carl Linnaeus